SS4 may refer to:
 SS-4 Sandal, a Soviet theatre ballistic missile
 Ambrosini SS.4, an Italian fighter aircraft prototype
 Pindad SS4, an Indonesian battle rifle in development
 SS 4, an Italian state highway, linking Rome to the Adriatic sea
 Super Select, a four-wheel drive system produced by Mitsubishi
 , a submarine of the United States Navy
 Super Saiyan 4, a fictional transformation from the Dragon Ball series